The R W B Stephens Medal is a prize from the Institute of Acoustics named after Dr Ray Stephens, the first President of the Institute of Acoustics. His main interests lay in physical acoustics but he is remembered by generations of students for his continuing work in education. The medal is awarded in odd-numbered years for outstanding contributions to acoustics research or education.

List of recipients
Source: Institute of Acoustics

See also

 List of physics awards

References

Physics awards
British science and technology awards